Kerchak is a fictional ape character in Edgar Rice Burroughs's original Tarzan novel, Tarzan of the Apes, and in movies and other media based on it.

History
In the novel Tarzan of the Apes, Kerchak is the "king" of a tribal band of Mangani, a fictional species of great ape intermediate between real life chimpanzees and gorillas. Per the common practice among Mangani tribes, the band self-identifies by the name of its leader, and is therefore known as "the tribe of Kerchak." Kerchak reigns by violence and fear heightened by his unpredictable mood swings and bouts of madness.

In the beginning of the original novel, Kerchak leads his band against Tarzan's marooned father and kills him; the infant Tarzan is saved by a female Mangani named Kala, who rears the baby and protects him against Kerchak, primarily by the policy of physical avoidance by which most of his wary subjects deal with their unpredictable king. However, after Tarzan reaches adulthood, the ape man's deeds and cleverness raise him to a prominence in the band Kerchak finds impossible to ignore, and the king attacks his human subject. The fight proves Kerchak's undoing, as Tarzan kills the tyrant, succeeding him for a time as king of the apes. Kerchak's terrible reign has made a lasting impression on his subjects, however, as even after his death his former tribe is often referred to as "the tribe of Kerchak", whatever other individual happens to be king.

Burroughs's later Tarzan book Jungle Tales of Tarzan, which relates additional details of Tarzan's youth among the apes, is also set during the period of Kerchak's rule of the ape band. Mysteriously however, Kerchak himself does not appear in the book, possibly indicating either frequent absences from the tribe or the author's unwillingness to complicate his story by use of a character whose significant interactions with Tarzan had already been detailed in the earlier book.

Disney version
Kerchak's character in the Walt Disney Feature Animation animated movie Disney adaptation (1999) was changed substantially from his original role in the series and is voiced by Lance Henriksen. The film made the Mangani tribe a family group of gorillas, with Kerchak a silverback gorilla (mature male) head of the family and mate to Tarzan's adoptive mother, Kala. He is essentially a combination of two of the novel's ape characters, Kerchak and Tublat, Kala's mate in Burroughs's original story. The film's Kerchak is closer in personality to Tublat, a fairly passive figure resentful of Tarzan, than to the original Kerchak (however, Tublat does appear as a separate character in the animated television series, The Legend of Tarzan, as a former rival to Kerchak cast out of the gorilla family many years before. He is characterized much like the novel's Kerchak, being vengeful and violent).

The film's Kerchak is originally warm and loving, playing with his original ape son. But after losing his child to Sabor the leopard, Kerchak becomes cold and uncaring. Though he has no role in the slaying of Tarzan's father, he refuses to accept Tarzan as his new son when Kala adopts him, only allowing him to stay with the gorillas because Kala refuses to abandon him and that Tarzan is orphaned. Kerchak disdains and shuns Tarzan during his childhood, but begins to accept him in adulthood after Tarzan kills Sabor (who was responsible for killing both Tarzan's parents, and Kerchak and Kala's son) and saves the group from the hunter Clayton. At the climax, when Kerchak sees Tarzan shot on the arm by Clayton, he attacks the hunter, but is fatally shot in the chest. Once Clayton is dealt with, Kerchak passes his leadership of the gorilla family to Tarzan; before succumbing to his injuries; signifying his ultimate acceptance of him as both adopted son and a worthy successor.

Disney's Kerchak also appears briefly in the video game Kingdom Hearts, first when Tarzan pleads with him and Kala to help him aid Sora, Donald and Goofy. Kerchak initially distrusts the trio, but later comes to accept them after they defeat Clayton and his Heartless companion the Stealth Sneak. He then allows them access to the world's Keyhole, which Sora seals, protecting the world from the Heartless permanently. In Kingdom Hearts, unlike the film, Kerchak survives the fight with Clayton. He, Kala, and Terk do not speak in the game, likely due to Sora, Goofy and Donald not being able to understand them like Tarzan.

Other versions
The character of Kerchak has also appeared in the syndicated comic strip Tarzan and in Tarzan comic books, in a portrayal essentially faithful to Burroughs's conception, generally in adaptations of the original novel.

The 1957 Tarzan movie Tarzan and the Lost Safari conflates Kerchak with Kala in a mention by the ape man to the female lead of his adoption as a baby by a she-ape. The account echoes Burroughs's version of Tarzan's youth, but names Kerchak rather than Kala as his ape foster mother. While neither actually appears in the film (nor any other ape character, aside from the ubiquitous Cheeta) the direct reference to the original Burroughs story is unusual for a movie of this period.

In the 2013 computer-animated film Tarzan, Kerchak is a silverback male gorilla leading a troop of gorillas, mated to Kala, with whom he has a baby. Challenged by the rogue Tublat, he successfully defends his dominance only to be treacherously brained with a rock by Tublat immediately after. Tublat then takes over the troop. Kala later adopts Tarzan to take the place of her deceased child and Tarzan grows up to eventually challenge and exile Tublat, thus avenging Kerchak.

Notes

Tarzan characters
Fictional gorillas
Fictional kings
Fictional tribal chiefs
Literary characters introduced in 1912
Fictional apes